Yigal Kopinsky (born 16 October 1985) is a Surinamese judoka. 

He competed at the 2016 Summer Olympics in Rio de Janeiro, in the men's 66 kg but lost to Houd Zourdani of Algeria in the second round.

Kopinsky is Jewish.

References

External links

1985 births
Living people
Surinamese male judoka
Judoka at the 2016 Summer Olympics
Olympic judoka of Suriname
Surinamese Jews
Jewish sportspeople